"Angeline" is a single by German dance band Groove Coverage. The single was released digitally on April 29, 2011 in Germany as the second single from their fourth studio album Riot on the Dancefloor. The song was written by Axel Konrad, Ole Wierk, Uwe Busse, David Sobol and Karlheinz Rupprich and originally released as "Lotusblume" by the former German Schlager group Die Flippers in the year 1989.

Music video
A music video to accompany the release of "Angeline" was first released onto YouTube on 21 April 2011 at a total length of three minutes and twenty-eight seconds.

Track listing

Chart performance

Release history

References

2011 singles
Groove Coverage songs
2010 songs